The 1975 Australian Manufacturers' Championship was an Australian motor racing competition for Group C Touring Cars. It was sanctioned by the Confederation of Australian Motor Sport as an Australian National Title  and was the fifth Australian Manufacturers' Championship.

The championship was won by Holden from Ford and Mazda.

Race schedule
The championship was contested over a five round series.

Each round was a single race of 250 km distance or greater, open to Group C Touring Cars.

Classes
Cars competed in four classes based on engine capacity:
 Up to and including 1300cc 
 1301-2000cc 
 2001-3000cc 
 Over 3000cc

Points system
For all rounds other than the Bathurst round, championship points were awarded on a 9-8-7-6-5-4-3-2-1 basis for the first nine places in each class. 
For the Bathurst round, championship points were awarded on an 18-16-14-12-10-8-6-4-2 basis for the first nine places in each class. 
Additional points were awarded at all rounds on a 4-3-2-1 basis for the first four outright places. 
Only the highest placed vehicle from each manufacturer was eligible to score points at any given round.

Championship standings

Note: Only models which contributed to a manufacturer’s points total are shown in the above table.

References

External links
 Images from the Bathurst round of the 1975 Australian Manufacturers’ Championship, autopics.com.au

Australian Manufacturers' Championship
Manufacturers' Championship